Functional medicine is a form of alternative medicine that encompasses a number of unproven and disproven methods and treatments. Its proponents claim that it focuses on the "root causes" of diseases based on interactions between the environment and the gastrointestinal, endocrine, and immune systems to develop "individualized treatment plans." It has been described as pseudoscience, quackery, and at its essence a rebranding of complementary and alternative medicine.

In the United States, functional medicine practices have been ruled ineligible for course credits by the American Academy of Family Physicians because of concerns they may be harmful.

Functional medicine was created by Jeffrey Bland,  who founded The Institute for Functional Medicine (IFM) in the early 1990s as part of one of his companies, HealthComm. IFM, which promotes functional medicine, became a registered non-profit in 2001. Later, Mark Hyman became a leading proponent.

Description 
Functional medicine is not well-defined by its proponents. Oncologist David Gorski wrote that the vagueness is a deliberate tactic that makes functional medicine difficult to challenge.

Proponents of functional medicine oppose established medical knowledge and reject its models, instead adopting a model of disease based on the notion of "antecedents", "triggers", and "mediators". These are meant to correspond to the underlying causes of health issues, the immediate causes, and the particular characteristics of a person's illness. A functional medicine practitioner devises a "matrix" from these factors to serve as the basis for treatment.

Treatments, practices, and concepts are generally not supported by medical evidence.

Functional medicine practitioners claim to diagnose and treat conditions that have been found by research studies to not exist, such as adrenal fatigue and numerous imbalances in body chemistry. Contrary to scientific evidence, Joe Pizzorno, a major figure in functional medicine, claimed that 25% of people in the United States have heavy metal poisoning and need to undergo detoxification. Many scientists state that such detox supplements are a waste of time and money. Detox has been also called "mass delusion".

Reception 
In 2014, the American Academy of Family Physicians withdrew course credits for functional medicine courses, having identified some of its treatments as "harmful and dangerous". In 2018, it partly lifted the ban, but only to allow overview classes, but not to teach its practice.

The opening of centers for functional medicine at the Cleveland Clinic Foundation and at the George Washington University was described by Gorski as an "unfortunate" example of quackery infiltrating academic medical centers.

References

Further reading 

Pseudoscience
Alternative medicine
Health fraud